The 1995 European Curling Championships were held from December 9 to 16 at the Sportzentrum in Grindelwald, Switzerland.

Men's

A Tournament

Group A

Group B

B Tournament

Group A

Playoffs

Women's

Group A

Group B

B Tournament

Group A

Playoffs

References

European Curling Championships, 1995
European Curling Championships, 1995
European Curling Championships
Curling competitions in Switzerland
International sports competitions hosted by Switzerland
European Curling Championships
European Curling Championships